Zaychuk is a surname. Notable people with the surname include:

Boris Zaychuk (born 1947), Russian hammer thrower
Vladyslav Zaychuk (born 1980), Ukrainian footballer